Joseph Andrew "Jay" Hughes Paulson is an American actor and poet who is often credited as Jay Paulson.

Personal life
Paulson was born in New York City, where he lived until 1984, when his father moved the family to Los Angeles.

Paulson graduated from UCLA with a B.A. in History and is a lifetime member of The Actors Studio.

He is married to Courtney Paulson née Kohl. They have two sons: Leland "Lee" Kohl Paulson and Valentine "Val" Kohl Paulson. They live near LAX.

He is a published poet, writing under the name Joseph Paulson.

Career

Paulson's first major television role was a regular recurring role as Zoe's boyfriend, Sean, on the comedy Cybill. He appeared in ten episodes of Season 2 and returned for a couple of episodes of Season 3.

Paulson starred in the film Rust Creek and Rolling Kansas. He also appeared in other films, including Go, Can't Hardly Wait, and Imaginary Heroes.

He is known for his work as Don Draper's long lost brother Adam Whitman on the AMC series Madmen.

He played Chaplain Tappman in George Clooney's remake of Catch-22.

He is a frequent collaborator of Gerry Fialka and has appeared in his two films, 'The Brother Side of the Wake' and 'The Mother Side of the Wake', both of which were produced by Bruno Kohfield-Galeano.

Filmography

Film

Television

References

External links

1978 births
Living people
American male film actors
American male television actors
Harvard-Westlake School alumni
Male actors from New York City
Male actors from Los Angeles
University of California, Los Angeles alumni